The Dresden Plant is a 580 megawatt (MW), natural gas power plant located south of Dresden, Ohio in Muskingum County, Ohio. The plant began operations in 2012 and is currently owned by American Electric Power (AEP).

History
The Dresden Plant was first conceived in 2000 when Dresden Energy, LLC, a subsidiary of Dominion Energy, proposed the construction of a combined cycle power plant utilizing natural gas as its energy source. Construction began in 2001, but numerous delays and rising natural gas prices made the plant uneconomical at that time. In 2007, AEP would purchase the partially built Dresden Plant from a subsidiary of Dominion for $85 million. The Dresden Plant would remain in an idle state with a skeleton crew until 2011 when AEP recommenced construction at the site. Commercial operations began on February 1, 2012. The total cost for the construction of the plant was $366 million.

Equipment
The Dresden Plant features three units. There are two, General Electric, 7FA gas turbines which are fed into heat recovery steam generators designed by Vogt-NEM and a single, General Electric, D11 steam turbine generator. All three turbines are equipped with LO-NOx burners and selective catalytic reduction (SCR) systems to reduce nitrogen oxide emissions.

See also

 List of power stations in Ohio

References

Energy infrastructure completed in 2012
Buildings and structures in Muskingum County, Ohio
Natural gas-fired power stations in Ohio
2012 establishments in Ohio
American Electric Power